L'Arbalète, or Arbalète may refer to:

L'Arbalète (train), an express train formerly operating in France and Switzerland
L'Arbalète, the original title of the French film released as Asphalt Warriors in the UK or The Syringe internationally
EFW N-20.02 Arbalète, a Swiss aircraft design
Payen Arbalète, a French homebuilt aircraft design